Solar power in Washington expanded to over 27 MW in 2013, largely due to a 30% federal tax credit, and declining installation costs. Washington also pays a feed-in tariff of up to $5,000/year of 15 cents/kWh, which is increased by a factor of 2.4 if the panels are made in the state and by an additional 1.2 if the inverters are made in state. By 2021, Washington has almost 300 MW of solar power.

Statistics
The average insolation is approximately 19% higher in Spokane than in Seattle.

Installed capacity

Utility-scale generation

See also

Wind power in Washington (state)
Solar power in the United States
Renewable energy in the United States

References

External links

Incentives and policies

Energy in Washington (state)
Washington